This is a list of notable seafood dishes. Seafood dishes are food dishes which use seafood (fish, shellfish or seaweed) as primary ingredients, and are ready to be served or eaten with any needed preparation or cooking completed. Many fish or seafood dishes have a specific name ("cioppino"), while others are simply described ("fried fish") or named for particular places ("Cullen skink"). Bisques are prepared with a variety of seafoods.

Seafood dishes

Mixed seafood dishes 

 Baik kut kyee kaik – Burmese fried noodle dish with squid and prawn
 Bánh canh – Vietnamese soup with thick rice noodles, that can use crab, prawn, fish cake, or shrimp
 Bisque – Cream-based soup of French origin, made from crustaceans
 Bún mắm – Vietnamese vermicelli soup, with shrimp, shrimp paste, or fish paste
 Bún riêu – Traditional Vietnamese soup, with fish, crab, or snail
 Ceviche – Latin American dish of marinated raw seafood
 Chowder – Category of soups
 Cioppino – Fish stew originating in San Francisco, with Dungeness crab, clam, mussels, squid, scallops, shrimp, and/or fish
 Crawfish pie – Louisiana dish
 Curanto – typical food in Chilean gastronomy based on baking seafood underground
 Espetada – Portuguese skewer dish that often uses squid or fish, especially monkfish
 Fideuà – Seafood dish from Valencia, Spain, similar to paella but with noodles instead of rice
 Halabos – Filipino process of cooking shrimp, crab, lobster, or fish
 Hoe – Korean raw food dishes consisting of a wide variety of seafoods
 Hoedeopbap – Korean dish 
 Kaeng som – Thai, Lao, and Malaysian curry dish that is based on fish, especially snakehead, as well as using shrimp or fish eggs
 Kedgeree – Indian-British fish and rice-based dish traditionally using haddock
 Maeuntang – Korean spicy fish soup
 Mie cakalang – Indonesian dish from North Sulawesi consisting of skipjack tuna in noodle soup
 Moules-frites – Famous Belgian dish of mussels and fries
 Namasu – Japanese dish of thinly sliced uncooked vegetables and seafood
 New England clam bake – Communal dining tradition from New England, method of cooking shellfish
 Paella – Rice dish from the Valencian Community, Spain, with mussels, shrimp, and fish
 Paelya – Philippine rice dish, similar to paella but differs with usage of glutinous rice
 Paila marina – Chilean seafood soup or stew, notable for usage of unique varieties of seafood such as giant barnacles, piura tunicates, and Chilean mussels
 Piaparan – Filipino dish using chicken or seafood
 Plateau de fruits de mer – French seafood dish
 Seafood basket
 Seafood birdsnest – Chinese cuisine dish
 Seafood boil – Type of social event involving the consumption of seafood
 Seafood cocktail – Shellfish appetizer
 Seafood pizza – Variety of pizza with seafood toppings
 Stroganina – Siberian dish of sliced raw fish
 Sundubu jjigae – Korean traditional soft tofu stew
 Surf and turf – U.S. dish of seafood and meat
 Sushi – Traditional Japanese dish of vinegared rice and raw seafood

Clam dishes

 Clams casino – a clam "on the halfshell" dish with breadcrumbs and bacon. It originated in Rhode Island in the United States and is often served as an appetizer in New England and is served in variations nationally.
 Clam cake – also known as clam fritters
 Clam dip – a dipping sauce and condiment
 Clam liquor – a liquid extracted during cooking and opening of clams. Undiluted it is called clam broth.
 Clam pie – Savory meat pie prepared using clams
 White clam pie – a pizza variety
 Clam soup – a soup prepared using clams as a main ingredient
 Clam chowder – a well-known chowder soup
 Jaecheop-guk – a clear Korean soup made with small freshwater clams
 Fabes con almejas – a clam and bean stew that originated in the principality of Asturias in the 19th century as peasant fare. It is a lighter variation of Asturian fabada whose primary ingredients are sausage, beans and pork.
 Fried clams – New England seafood dish
 New England clam bake – also simply called a "clam bake"
 Clams oreganata – an Italian American seafood dish served most commonly as an appetizer
 Clam sauce – used as a topping for pasta
 Spaghetti alle vongole – Italian and Italian-American dish of spaghetti with clams
 Steamed clams – Seafood dish consisting of clams
 Stuffed clam – American seafood dish

Crab dishes

 Bisque (food) – a smooth, creamy, highly seasoned soup of French origin, classically based on a strained broth (coulis) of crustaceans. It can be made from lobster, crab, shrimp or crayfish.
 Black pepper crab – one of the two most popular ways that crab is served in Malaysia and Singapore. It is made with hard-shell crabs, and fried with black pepper. Unlike the other popular chilli crab dish, it is less heavy due to the absence of a sauce.
 Bún riêu – Bún riêu cua is served with tomato broth and topped with crab or shrimp paste.
 Chilli crab – a seafood dish popular in Malaysia and Singapore. Mud crabs are commonly used and are stir-fried in a semi-thick, sweet and savoury tomato and chilli based sauce.
 Corn crab soup – a dish found in Chinese cuisine, American Chinese cuisine, and Canadian Chinese cuisine, it is actually cream of corn soup with egg white and crab meat or imitation crab meat added.
 Crab cake – a variety of fishcake which is popular in the United States composed of crab meat and various other ingredients, such as bread crumbs, milk, mayonnaise, eggs, yellow onions, and seasonings. Especially popular in the Mid-Atlantic state of Maryland.
 Crab dip – typically prepared with cream cheese and lump crab meat.
 Crab ice cream – a Japanese creation, it is described as having a sweet taste. The island of Hokkaido, Japan, is known for manufacturing crab ice cream.
 Crab in oyster sauce – a Chinese seafood dish of crab served in savoury oyster sauce. It is a popular dish in Asia, that can be found from China, Malaysia, Singapore, Indonesia to the Philippines.
 Crab in Padang sauce or Padang crab (Indonesian: Kepiting saus Padang) – an Indonesian seafood dish of crab served in hot and spicy Padang sauce. It is a popular dish in Indonesia.
 Crab rangoon – deep-fried dumpling appetizers served in American Chinese and, more recently, Thai restaurants, stuffed with a combination of cream cheese, lightly flaked crab meat (more commonly, canned crab meat or imitation crab meat), with scallions, and/or garlic.
 Curacha Alavar – Filipino spanner crabs in coconut milk with various spices
 Deviled crab – a crab meat croquette. The crab meat is slowly sauteed with seasonings, breaded (traditionally with stale Cuban bread), rolled into the approximate shape of a rugby football or a small potato, and deep fried.
 Echizen kanimeshi – a type of ekiben from Fukui Prefecture, on the coast of the Sea of Japan
 Ganzuke – a variety of shiokara, salted fermented seafood in Japanese cuisine
 Gejang – a variety of jeotgal, salted fermented seafood in Korean cuisine, which is made by marinating fresh raw crabs either in ganjang (soy sauce) or in a sauce based on chili pepper powder. A similar dish (生腌蟹) exists in China.
 Crab and lobster rolls by the sea in Kent, England Ginataang alimango/Ginataang alimasag – Filipino black crab or flower crab in coconut milk with calabaza and spices
 Ginataang curacha – Filipino spanner crabs in coconut milk
 Halabos – Filipino crabs (or other crustaceans) cooked in saltwater with spices
 Inulukan – Filipino black crabs in coconut milk and taro leaves.
 Kakuluwo curry – a traditional Sri Lankan crab curry.
 Kanijiru – a traditional Japanese crab soup
 Kare rajungan – a traditional Indonesian of a blue crab in a curry sauce. It is a delicacy from Tuban, East Java.
 Ketam Masak Lemak Cili Api campur Nenas – a traditional Malaysian crab dish which crab is cooked with green spicy chilli and coconut milk together with pineapples. The sweetness of the crab meat (normally flower crab) is intensified by adding the pineapples.
 Kani Cream Korokke – a Japanese take on the traditional French croquette; can be made with either real or imitation crab meat (although imitation crab meat versions are more commonplace).
 Njandu roast – Kerala style crab roast.
 Pastel de jaiba – Chilean crab (jaiba in local Spanish) pie.
 She-crab soup – a rich soup, similar to bisque, made of milk or heavy cream, crab or fish stock, Atlantic blue crab meat, and (traditionally) crab roe, and a small amount of dry sherry.
 Soft-shell crab – a culinary term for crabs which have recently molted their old exoskeleton and are still soft.
 Taba ng talangka – traditional Filipino fermented crab paste. It can be eaten as is over white rice, but can also be used as a condiment or as an ingredient in various Filipino seafood dishes.
 West Indies salad – a variation of crab meat ceviche that originated in the Mobile, Alabama area and is still a regional seafood delicacy enjoyed today.

Fish dishes

Carp 

 Fisherman's soup – Hungarian fish stew
 Masgouf – fried carp dish from Iraq

Catfish 

 Catfish stew – Catfish dish from the American South
 Mohinga – rice noodle and fish soup from Myanmar

Cod and saltfish 

 Bacalaíto – Seafood dish from Puerto Rico
 Bacalhau à Brás – Portuguese salt cod dish
 Bacalhau à Gomes de Sá – Typical fish from Porto, Portugal
 Bacalhau à Zé do Pipo – Bacalhau casserole
 Bacalhau com natas – Salt cod casserole
 Bacalhau com todos – Portuguese salt cod dish
 Baccalà all'abruzzese – Italian dish
 Baccalà alla lucana – Christmas dish of cod and red peppers from Basilicata, Italy
 Baccalà alla vicentina – Venetian food dish
 Bolinhos de bacalhau – Portuguese and Brazilian dish of fish balls
 Brandade – Emulsion of salt cod, olive oil, and potatoes
 Esgarret – Valencian cod dish
 Esqueixada – Catalan fish salad
 Fish and brewls – Newfoundland dish of cod and hardtack
 Stamp and Go – Jamaican fritter of saltfish

Eel 

 Eel noodles
 Eel pie
 Jellied eels
 Kabayaki
 Unadon

Flatfish 

 Sole meunière

Milkfish 

 Milkfish congee
 Sate Bandeng

Salmon 

 Dishwasher salmon
 Lox

Sharks and rays 

 Bake and shark – Trinidadian street food dish of shark
 Sambal stingray – Barbecued stingray with sambal
 Shark chutney – Shark dish from Seychelles

Snapper

Tuna

Lobster dishes

Octopus dishes

Oyster dishes

Shrimp dishes

 Balchão – Goan dish with shrimp, prawn, and shrimp

Squid dishes

See also

 Eating live seafood
 Edible seaweed
 List of beef dishes
 List of chicken dishes
 List of fish and seafood soups
 List of fish dishes
 List of lamb dishes
 List of pork dishes
 List of raw fish dishes
 List of seafood companies
 List of types of seafood
 Seafood dishes
 Seafood restaurant

References

External links
 

 
Seafood